The Põltsamaa is the 3rd longest river in Estonia. It flows through Põltsamaa Parish, and the centre of Põltsamaa town on the north-east side of Põltsamaa Castle. It's a tributary to Pedja.

References

External links

Rivers of Estonia
Landforms of Jõgeva County
Landforms of Järva County
Landforms of Lääne-Viru County